Pierre Roger may refer to:

Pope Clement VI (1291–1352)
Pierre Roger de Beaufort, later Pope Gregory XI
Pierre Roger (swimmer) (born 1983), French swimmer